Aleksander Hertz (1879–1928) was a Polish film producer and director. Hertz was an influential figure in early Polish cinema, directing films such as the historical Countess Walewska in 1914. He founded the "Sfinks" film company. Hertz was of Jewish heritage.

Selected filmography

Director
 Countess Walewska (1914)
 Ludzie bez jutra (People with no Tomorrow)

References

Bibliography 
 Liehm, Mira & Liehm, Antonín J. The Most Important Art: Eastern European Film After 1945. University of California Press, 1977.

External links 
 

1878 births
1928 deaths
Polish film producers
Polish film directors
Film people from Warsaw
19th-century Polish Jews